is a Japanese football player. He plays for FC Gifu.

Club statistics
Updated to end of 2018 season.

References

External links
Profile at FC Ryukyu

1995 births
Living people
Association football people from Tokyo
Japanese footballers
J2 League players
J3 League players
FC Ryukyu players
FC Gifu players
Association football forwards